This is a list of Croatian television related events from 1975.

Events

Debuts

Television shows
 Gruntovčani (1975)

Ending this year

Births
13 September - Ines Bojanić, actress

Deaths